Orion Samuelson (born March 31, 1934) is a retired American broadcaster, known for his agriculture broadcasts and his ability to explain agribusiness and food production in an understandable way.  He was inducted into the Radio Hall of Fame in 2003.

Career
Many of those living in the Midwest over the past six decades remember the big, booming voice of Orion Samuelson that explained the business of agriculture and food production in an understandable way. He was a good guy and a good listener.

Samuelson was born on a dairy farm in Ontario, Wisconsin, near LaCrosse. Growing up on the farm Samuelson was expected to take over the family business, but a leg disease made it impossible to do heavy work. He considered becoming a Lutheran pastor before deciding on six months of radio school. His early work was based in Wisconsin, at WKLJ in Sparta, WHBY in Appleton, and WBAY-TV/AM in Green Bay.

Samuelson was heard on WGN radio in Chicago for sixty years as the station's head agriculture broadcaster from 1960 through 2020. In May 1960, one of Mr. Samuelson's first assignments for WGN was to emcee the National Barn Dance, a long running program that WGN had just acquired when WLS radio discontinued its association with Prairie Farmer magazine. WLS had converted to "The Station With Personality" and started playing rock 'n' roll. Three years into his tenure at WGN, Samuelson was the staffer that read the news of the John F. Kennedy assassination. His career led him to have dinner at the White House and travel to 43 countries  including Cuba, where he shook hands with Fidel Castro, Moscow where he met with Mikhail Gorbachev, and England to broadcast live from the Royal Agricultural Show (aka Royal Show). He traveled with the Secretary of Agriculture and the Prime Minister of India to see the Taj Mahal. He interviewed and or met every US president from Dwight D. Eisenhower to Donald Trump, including John F. Kennedy (when he was still a Senator), Lyndon Johnson, Richard Nixon, Gerald Ford, Ronald Reagan, George H. W. Bush, George W. Bush and Bill Clinton, and finally, after he was 20 years out of the Oval Office, Harry S. Truman.

During the 1960s, Samuelson hosted an early-morning show on WGN-TV, Top 'O' the Morning, first with organist Harold Turner, then with Max Armstrong. From 1975 to 2005, Samuelson was the host of U.S. Farm Report, a weekly television news magazine dedicated to agriculture. U.S. Farm Report continued without Samuelson after his departure. Samuelson hosted a similar show, This Week in Agribusiness, along with his longtime collaborator Max Armstrong, until his retirement, and continues to make occasional commentaries on that show with Armstrong as host. Both shows aired on 190 Midwest stations via first-run syndication.

Politically, Samuelson supported the production of ethanol fuel from corn, to help American farmers.

On the lighter side, Samuelson and a studio group dubbed the "Uff da Band" once recorded covers of Yogi Yorgesson's novelty songs I Yust Go Nuts at Christmas and Yingle Bells. Samuelson held the same position in the broadcasting industry for 60 consecutive years through 2020, second only to Los Angeles Dodgers Radio Network announcer Vin Scully.

In 2001, Samuelson was named a laureate of The Lincoln Academy of Illinois and was awarded the Order of Lincoln – the highest award bestowed by the State of Illinois. The University of Illinois presented Samuelson with the honorary degree of Doctor of Letters. He was honored at the 2010 Wisconsin Corn/Soy Expo in Wisconsin Dells. Samuelson received a custom-engraved Norwegian horse plaque to commemorate the occasion from presidents of the Wisconsin Corn Growers Association, the Wisconsin Soybean Association, the Wisconsin Agri-Services Association and the Wisconsin Pork Association. On December 9, 2010, the southwest corner of E. Illinois Street & N. Cityfront Plaza Drive was named 'Orion Samuelson Way' by the city of Chicago. In 2014 he was awarded the VERITAS award by American Agri-Women (AAW) Organization.

Samuelson serves as a Board Member Emeritus for the Illinois Agricultural Leadership Foundation (IALF) having previously served as chairman of the board. He also serves on the Farm Foundation Bennett Round Table, and is a former member of the board of the Agriculture Future of America, the Board of Farm Safety 4 Just Kids, the board of directors of the Foods Resource Bank, a former trustee of the Cornerstone Foundation of Lutheran Social Services of Illinois and a former member of the board of trustees of the National 4-H Council.

On November 1, 2012, Samuelson published his autobiography "You Can’t Dream Big Enough" was published by Bantry Bay Media.

In 2014 the CME Group and the National Association of Farm Broadcasting (NAFB) Foundation announced the inaugural recipient of the Orion Samuelson Scholarship ($5,000) for a senior at the University of Illinois, Urbana-Champaign. The scholarship is  presented to a college student seeking a career in agricultural communications.

On September 23, 2020, Samuelson announced his retirement from WGN Radio.  His final broadcast on WGN was the noon business report on December 31, 2020.

Awards
 National Radio Hall of Fame, 2003
 American Farm Bureau's Distinguished Service Award, 1998
 4-H Alumni Award
 Oscar
 Norsk Høstfest Scandinavian-American Hall of Fame 
 Orion Samuelson was inducted as a Laureate of The Lincoln Academy of Illinois and awarded the Order of Lincoln (the State's highest honor) by the governor of Illinois in 2001 in the area of Communication and Agriculture. American Agri-Women Veritas Award, 2015

Listen to
 Christmas Eve air check from Radio Hall of Fame

References

External links
This Week in Agribusiness
Samuelson Sez - Weekly commentary

Tribune Radio Network
Orion Samuelson, Keynote Speaker Profile American Agri-Women Veritas Award
Legendary agribusiness broadcaster Orion Samuelson on 60 years 

American television personalities
People from La Crosse, Wisconsin
Radio personalities from Chicago
1934 births
Living people
American Lutherans
American people of Norwegian descent